Erskine is a suburb of Mandurah. It is bound by the Old Coast Road to the west (with Halls Head on the opposite side) and the Peel Inlet to the east. It is home to a minor shopping centre, including a Coles supermarket.

Transport
As stated above, Erskine's western border is Old Coast Road, which is the main thoroughfare through Mandurah's southern suburbs and connects Erskine to Mandurah, Perth and Bunbury. Erskine is also well-served by public transport with Transperth bus routes 591 and 594 servicing the suburb. The 591 service terminates in Erskine at Sticks Boulevard/ Willoughbridge Crescent while the 594 proceeds towards Dawesville via Old Coast Road.

References

Suburbs of Mandurah